Dzmitry Ramualdavich Klimovich ((Dmitri Klimovich); born 9 February 1984) is a Belarusian football defender. He played most of his career with FC BATE Borisov and FC Torpedo-BelAZ Zhodino.

Honours
BATE Borisov
Belarusian Premier League champion: 2006
Belarusian Cup winner: 2005–06

Gomel
Belarusian Super Cup winner: 2012

Zimbru Chișinău
Moldovan Cup winner: 2013–14
Moldovan Super Cup winner: 2014

External links

Dzmitry Klimovich at FC Zimbru website

1984 births
Living people
Belarusian footballers
Association football defenders
Belarusian expatriate footballers
Expatriate footballers in Moldova
FC Torpedo-BelAZ Zhodino players
FC BATE Borisov players
FC Minsk players
FC Gomel players
FC Belshina Bobruisk players
FC Zimbru Chișinău players
FC Granit Mikashevichi players
FC Krumkachy Minsk players
FC Arsenal Dzerzhinsk players
Footballers from Minsk